The commentators teams of selected major sports and SportsCenter anchors of the Latin American networks of ESPN International, such as ESPN, ESPN 2, ESPN 3, ESPN+, ESPN Brasil and ESPN Caribbean.

English-language, Spanish-language and Portuguese-language announcers

SportsCenter (Northern feed) and ESPN Deportes anchors
Álvaro Morales
Carolina Padrón
Karin Ontiveros
Kary Correa
Cristina Alexander
Vanessa Huppenkothen
Jorge Eduardo Sánchez
Sergio Dipp
Paulina García Robles

SportsCenter (Southern feed) 
Quique Wolff 
Miguel Simón
Pablo Ferreira
Guillermo Poggi
Jorge Barril
Ayrton Ruiz
Morena Beltrán
Aline Moine
Agostina Scalise

American Football

Auto Racing

Baseball

*Only the All-Star Game, the Home Run Derby and the Serie del Rey.

Basketball

Boxing

Cricket

Cycling

Futsal

Golf

Ice Hockey

Field Hockey

Ice Skating

Horse Racing

Motorcycle Racing

Rugby

Soccer

Softball

Surf

Polo

Tennis

Ncaa Other Events

Poker

Olympic Games

See also
ESPN Deportes
ESPN Latin America
ESPN Brasil 
ESPN International
ESPN

ESPN Latin America announcers
 Latin America announcersor
ESPN Latin America